Solomonovo is a village in Uzhhorod Raion (district) of Zakarpattia Oblast (province) in western Ukraine. It had a population of 1,342, according to the 2001 census.

It is the most western Ukrainian municipality. The village is located in close proximity to the city of Chop and Ukrainian border with Hungary and Slovakia.

The village is well known for its Škoda owned Eurocar subsidiary. Situated on the Highway M06 (part of the European route E573), in the village is located vehicle border crossing with Hungary Chop–Tysa to Záhony and railway border crossing with Slovakia Chop–Strazh to Čierna nad Tisou.

According to the Ukrainian Census, about 60% of the population speak Hungarian, while over 37% speak the Ukrainian language.

People born here
 Petro Maha, Ukrainian lyricist, Merited Artist of Ukraine

Gallery

References

External links
 Solomonovo – karpataljaturizmus.net
 Solomonovo (Соломоновo) of Ukraine 1:100,000 topographic maps

Villages in Uzhhorod Raion